Hussein bin Abdullah (Al-Ḥusayn ibn ʿAbdullāh; born 28 June 1994) is Crown Prince of Jordan as the son of King Abdullah II. As a member of the Hashemite dynasty, the royal family of Jordan since 1921, he is a 42nd-generation direct descendant of the prophet Muhammad.

Hussein, currently a Captain in the Jordanian Armed Forces, started his education in Jordan and in 2016 he graduated from Georgetown University with a degree in International History. Since reaching the age of majority in 2012, Hussein has functioned as regent on several occasions and has accompanied his father on a number of local and international visits. Hussein is in charge of the Crown Prince Foundation, which is responsible for a technical university and a number of scientific and humanitarian initiatives. In 2015, at the age of 20, Hussein became the youngest person to chair a UN Security Council session. After graduating from Sandhurst in 2017, he made a global debut when he addressed the UN General Assembly in September of that year.

Early life and education 
Hussein was born on 28 June 1994 at King Hussein Medical Center in Amman to the then-Crown Prince Abdullah and Crown Princess Rania. Abdullah had met Rania, a marketing employee at Apple Inc., in Amman at a dinner organized by Abdullah's sister Princess Aisha in January 1993; they married six months later. Hussein is the namesake of his grandfather, King Hussein. Hussein claims descent in the male line from Muhammad's daughter Fatimah and Ali, the fourth caliph. The Hashemites ruled Mecca for over 700 years until its 1925 conquest by the House of Saud, and have ruled Jordan since 1921. The Hashemites are the oldest-ruling dynasty in the Muslim world, and are the second-oldest-ruling dynasty in the world, after the Imperial House of Japan. His paternal grandmother is an English convert to Islam, and his mother is of Palestinian descent.

Hussein is the eldest child of Abdullah. He has three siblings: Princess Iman, Princess Salma and Prince Hashem. Hussein started his primary education at the International School of Choueifat and the International Amman Academy; he finished his high school at King's Academy in 2012, obtained a bachelor's degree in International History at Georgetown University in 2016, and graduated from the Royal Military Academy Sandhurst in 2017. He is a captain in the Jordanian Armed Forces.

Heir apparent 

Abdullah was not expected to succeed to the throne despite being King Hussein's eldest son; the King had appointed his younger brother, Abdullah's uncle, Prince Hassan, as heir designate in 1965. Shortly before his death on 7 February 1999, the King replaced Hassan with Abdullah. When Abdullah became king, he named his younger half-brother, Prince Hamzah, as heir designate on his accession.

On 28 November 2004, King Abdullah removed Hamzah from his title as crown prince. Though the title of crown prince was left vacant, the Constitution of Jordan provides for agnatic primogeniture, meaning the monarch's eldest son is automatically first in the line of succession to the Jordanian throne unless decreed otherwise. Hussein thus became heir apparent as soon as his half-uncle lost the status, and analysts widely expected the King to bestow the formal title on Hussein. The title was conferred on 2 July 2009, when a royal decree naming him as crown prince, effective immediately, was issued.

Official duties 

Unlike the King's, the Crown Prince's role is mostly ceremonial under the Constitution, and the title is not associated with any political post. Hussein performed his first official engagement in June 2010, when he represented his father at the celebrations of the anniversary of the Arab Revolt and the Armed Forces Day.

Hussein has served his father on both official and military missions, and has served several times as regent during the King's absence from the country. Hussein is in charge of the Crown Prince Foundation, which is responsible for a technical university, and a number of scientific and humanitarian initiatives. The foundation established the Haqiq initiative, which aims to encourage youth for volunteerism; a NASA internship program; MASAR initiative to encourage space technology innovation; and the Hearing Without Borders initiative that funds cochlear implants for Jordanians with impaired hearing. The interns from the NASA program built a cubesat (mini satellite) named JY1, Jordan's first satellite which launched from California in 2018. The cubesat project was named after the late King Hussein's amateur radio callsign.

In 2013, Hussein participated in a training session with the members of the Jordanian special forces elite 71st Counter Terrorism Battalion. On 14 July 2014, Hussein visited the King Hussein Medical Center in Amman where injured Palestinians who fled Gaza were receiving medical treatment.

On 23 April 2015, the then-20-year-old Prince Hussein became the youngest person ever to chair a UN Security Council session. During the meeting, the prince oversaw a debate about methods of preventing young people from joining extremist groups. Ban Ki-moon, the then-Secretary-General of the United Nations, said Hussein is "not yet 21 years old, but he is already a leader in the 21st century". The Security Council unanimously adopted Resolution 2250 titled "Maintenance of international peace and security"; the resolution was presented at the initiative of Jordan during the session Hussein presided over.

In May 2017, Hussein made the welcoming speech during a session of the World Economic Forum that was held on the Jordanian shores of the Dead Sea. In September 2017, after having graduated from Sandhurst, he gave Jordan's speech at the UN General Assembly. Observers speculated the Crown Prince would start to play a more prominent role in Jordan and abroad.

Personal life 

The Crown Prince's Instagram account has more than three million followers ; he posts pictures that showcase his hobbies, which include reading, playing football, cooking, motorcycling and playing the guitar. He also enjoys playing chess in his spare time.

On 27 September 2021, it was reported that Hussein had contracted COVID-19. The Royal Court said in a statement that Hussein had received the vaccine.

On 17 August 2022, the Royal Hashemite Court announced the engagement of Crown Prince Hussein to Saudi citizen Rajwa Al Saif. The engagement ceremony was held at the home of Al Saif's father in Riyadh the capital and largest city of the Kingdom of Saudi Arabia. Al Saif, born on 28 April 1994 in Riyadh, is the daughter of Khaled bin Musaed bin Saif bin Abdulaziz Al Saif and Azza bint Nayef bin Abdulaziz bin Ahmed Al Sudairi (daughter of a maternal first cousin of King Salman of Saudi Arabia). She attended the Syracuse University School of Architecture. The couple will marry on 1 June 2023.

Honours 
National honours
 Knight of the Order of the Star of Jordan.
Foreign honours
: 1st class of the King Hamad Order of the Renaissance (5 February 2019).
: Knight Grand Cross of the Order of St. Olav (2 March 2020).
 : Commander Grand Cross Order of the Polar Star (15 November 2022).

See also 
 Hashemites
 Crown Prince of Jordan
 King Hussein
 List of current heirs apparent

References

External links 

 

1994 births
Crown Princes of Jordan
House of Hashim
Jordanian people of Palestinian descent
Jordanian people of English descent
Jordanian princes
Jordanian Sunni Muslims
Jordanian royalty
Living people
People from Amman

Heirs apparent
Georgetown College (Georgetown University) alumni
Sons of kings
Graduates of the Royal Military Academy Sandhurst